Bennett Chenene (born 2 February 1984) is a South African footballer who plays as a midfielder for Ivorian club Williamsville Athletic Club.

Career
After having been without a club for four years, Chenene was invited in December 2018 by Williamsville Athletic Club in Ivory Coast, with the club keen on offering him a deal to revive his career. However, complications with the paperwork required for the player's move from another country hindered the winger's chance at the time. However, the deal was finalized in the beginning of August 2019.

References

External links

Bennett Chenene at Footballdatabase

1984 births
Living people
People from Sebokeng
South African soccer players
South African expatriate soccer players
Association football midfielders
South Africa international soccer players
Orlando Pirates F.C. players
AmaZulu F.C. players
Bloemfontein Celtic F.C. players
Moroka Swallows F.C. players
SuperSport United F.C. players
Winners Park F.C. players
University of Pretoria F.C. players
Expatriate footballers in Ivory Coast
Sportspeople from Gauteng